The voiced bilabial trill is a type of consonantal sound, used in some spoken languages.

Features
Features of the voiced bilabial trill:
 In most instances, it is only found as the trilled release of a prenasalized stop.

Varieties

Occurrences

The Knorkator song "[Buchstabe]" (the actual title is a glyph) on the 1999 album Hasenchartbreaker uses a similar sound (though linguolabial instead of bilabial) to replace "br" in a number of German words (e.g.  for ).

Prenasalized

Prestopped trills and stops with trill release

Phonology
In many of the languages in which the bilabial trill occurs, it occurs only as part of a prenasalized bilabial stop with trilled release, . That developed historically from a prenasalized stop before a relatively high back vowel like . In such instances, the sounds are usually still limited to the environment of a following . However, the trills in Mangbetu may precede any vowel and are sometimes preceded by only a nasal.

See also
Index of phonetics articles

Notes

References

External links
 
Oro Win recordings

Trill consonants
Bilabial consonants
Pulmonic consonants
Oral consonants